Sporel is a Turkish surname. Notable people with the surname include:

 Hasan Kamil Sporel (1894–1968), Turkish footballer
 Zeki Rıza Sporel (1898–1969), Turkish footballer

Turkish-language surnames